Corbion N.V., formerly Centrale Suiker Maatschappij (CSM) N.V. (Central Sugar Company in English), is a Dutch food and biochemicals company headquartered in Amsterdam, Netherlands. It produces bioingredient-based foods, chemicals derived from organic acids, and lactic acid based solutions for the food, chemical and pharmaceutical industries. The company was founded on August 21, 1919.

History
The Centrale Suiker Maatschappij n.v. was founded in 1919 for the production of sugar from sugar beet. The company was a merger between NV Wester Suikerraffinaderij, NV "Hollandia", ASMij, and CV Van Loon & Co. The merger included the 17 private sugar factories that remained from the 28 that still existed in 1910. From the mid-1970s, the company grew from acquisitions.

A major acquisition was that of the bakery ingredient division of Unilever in 2000, for €670 million. In 2001, the Foods Division was sold, with well-known brands such as Hak, Honig and De Ruijter. In 2005, the Sweets Division was put on sale. With brands such as Venco, Red Band and Sportlife, some €750 million in sales at CSM disappeared.

The sugar activities would gradually gain an increasingly smaller share of total company revenue. In mid-2006, CSM announced that it would sell its sugar operations to Royal Cosun, the parent company of Suiker Unie. This company became the only remaining sugar producer in the Netherlands. CSM Suiker then produced approximately 350,000 to 380,000 tons of sugar per year.

Bakery products
Over the years, CSM increasingly focused on the market for the food and confectionery industry, with bakery products and food ingredients. The company was a major supplier to Europe and North America.

In February 2010, CSM announced the acquisition of Best Brands, one of the largest producers of bakery products in the United States. Best Brands achieved sales of $538 million in 2009. After the acquisition, CSM became the market leader in bakery products with a total annual turnover of more than $2.3 billion.

In early May 2012, CSM decided to fully sell this division and to fully focus on growth in the bio-ingredient divisions Purac and Caravan Ingredients.

In March 2013, the sale of the bakery activities in Europe and North America to investment company Rhône Capital was announced, for more than €1 billion. Rhône also acquired the brand name CSM. The sale became final on July 3, 2013, and CSM changed its name to Corbion. The company was then fully focused on the production of organic food ingredients and biochemicals. It had three divisions: CSM Bakery Supplies Europe, CSM Bakery Supplies North America and PURAC (lactic acid and lactic acid derivatives).

Lactic acid
In the late 1960s, the production of lactic acid from fermented sugar began. CSM was the market leader in lactic acid and lactic acid derivatives such as ingredients and supplements for shelf life extension of food, cosmetic products, solvents, biodegradable plastics, pharmaceutical and medical applications.

The lactic acid division built a lactide factory in Thailand that became operational at the end of 2011, costing €45 million. The lactide made from lactic acid is a raw material for polylactic acid and biodegradable bioplastics.

At the beginning of 2016 Corbion decided to build a PLA factory next to the existing factory in Thailand, Polylactic acid (PLA) is a bioplastic produced from biomass and biodegradables. Corbion then became the second provider in the market alongside the American company Natureworks.
In November 2016 Corbion joined forces with Total to develop bioplastics by creating a 50/50 joint venture to produce and market polylactic (PLA) polymers called Total Corbion PLA. Total Corbion PLA announces the start-up of its 75,000 tons per year PLA (Poly Lactic Acid) bioplastics plant in Rayong, Thailand on 3 December 2018.

Algae ingredients
In 2017 Corbion acquired TerraVia (formerly Solazyme), a food and specialty ingredients company with a broad and diverse platform centered on ingredients and branded products derived from microalgae.
San Francisco-based TerraVia leverages its microalgae platform to deliver high-value ingredients with clear benefits, such as Omega-3 for animal nutrition and tailored oils, structured fats and proteins for food and biochemical applications. It operates an R&D center in San Francisco, and two manufacturing facilities: one in the US and one in Brazil.

On 25 March 2019 Corbion acquired Granotec do Brazil to drive further expansion in food ingredients in Latin America.

See also 
 Droste

References

External links
 
 

Companies based in Amsterdam